Eddie Farnsworth (born May 4, 1961) is an American politician and a former Republican member of the Arizona State House of Representatives and Arizona State Senate. Farnsworth previously served in the House consecutively from January 10, 2011 until January 14, 2013 in the District 22 seat, in the District 12 seat from 2013 to 2019, and non-consecutively from January 2001 until January 2009 in the District 22 and District 30 seats. Farnsworth served in the State Senate representing District 12 from January 14, 2019 to his retirement in 2021.

Education 
Farnsworth earned his BA from the University of Arizona and his MBAs in investments and finance from George Washington University and his JD from its law school.

Elections 
 2000 – When District 30 incumbent Republican Representative Jeff Groscost ran for Arizona Senate, Farnsworth ran alongside incumbent Representative Karen Johnson in the three-way September 12, 2000 Republican Primary, placing first with 9,773 votes, and took the first seat in the four-way November 7, 2000 General election with 45,473 votes, with Representative Johnson taking the second seat ahead of Democratic nominees Eileen Fellner (who had run for the seat in 1996) and Linda Tongé.
 2002 – Redistricted to District 22, Representative Johnson redistricted to District 18, and with incumbent Democratic Representatives Richard Miranda running for Arizona Senate and John Loredo redistricted to District 13, Farnsworth ran in the five-way September 10, 2002 Republican Primary, placing first with 6,917 votes ahead of Andy Biggs; Biggs and Farnsworth were unopposed for the November 5, 2002 General election with Biggs taking the first seat and Farnsworth taking the second seat with 27,630 votes.
 2004 – Farnsworth and Representative Biggs were unopposed for the September 7, 2004 Republican Primary; Farnsworth placed first with 12,157 votes; In the three-way November 2, 2004 General election, Farnsworth won the first seat with 55,674 votes, and Biggs won the second seat ahead of Libertarian candidate Wade Reynolds.
 2006 – Farnsworth and Representative Biggs were challenged in the four-way September 12, 2006 Republican Primary; Farnsworth placed first with 8,991 votes, and Biggs placed second; in the November 7, 2006 General election, Farnsworth took the first seat with 38,817 votes and Biggs took the second seat ahead of Libertarian candidate Edward Schwebel.
 2008 – Challenging incumbent Republican Senator Thayer Verschoor, Farnsworth ran in the three-way September 2, 2008 Republican Primary, but lost to Senator Verschoor; Verschoor was unopposed for the November 2, 2010 General election, and served in the seat from 2003 until 2011.
 2010 – With incumbent Representative Biggs running for Arizona Senate, Farnsworth ran alongside incumbent Representative Laurin Hendrix in the six-way August 24, 2010 Republican Primary, placing first with 16,727 votes, Steve Urie placed second, and Representative Hendrix third; Farnsworth and Urie were unopposed for the November 2, 2010 General election; Farnsworth took the first seat with 51,533 votes and Urie took the second seat.
 2012 – Redistricted to District 12, and with incumbent Republican Representatives Steve Montenegro redistricted to District 13 and Jerry Weiers retiring, Farnsworth ran in the three-way August 28, 2012 Republican Primary; Farnsworth placed first with 14,816 votes, with Warren Petersen taking second ahead of former state Senator Larry Chesley; Farnsworth and Petersen were unopposed for the November 6, 2012 General election, with Farnsworth taking the first seat with 53,925 votes and Petersen taking the second seat.
 2014 – Farnsworth and Warren Petersen were unopposed in the Republican primary. Farnsworth and Petersen defeated D.J. Rothans in the general election, with Farnsworth receiving 32,843 votes.
 2016 – Farnsworth ran against Republicans Travis Grantham and Lacinda Lewis in the primary, placing first. Farnsworth and Grantham then ran unopposed in the District 12 November general election. Farnsworth received the most votes in the general election with 67,225 votes.
 2018 – Farnsworth ran for District 12's seat in the Arizona State Senate, beating Jenny Lindblom in the Republican primaries. Farnsworth went on to win the general election against Democrat Elizabeth Brown with 60,959 votes.

References

External links 
 Official page at the Arizona State Legislature
 Campaign site
 

1961 births
21st-century American politicians
Arizona lawyers
Republican Party Arizona state senators
George Washington University School of Business alumni
George Washington University Law School alumni
Living people
Republican Party members of the Arizona House of Representatives
People from Gilbert, Arizona
University of Arizona alumni